Vital Signs is a 1990 American comedy-drama film directed by Marisa Silver and starring Adrian Pasdar, Diane Lane and Jimmy Smits.

Premise
A group of 3rd year medical students has to come with terms with the personal and professional tension that goes on in a teaching hospital.

Cast
Adrian Pasdar as Michael Chatham
Diane Lane as Gina Wyler
Jimmy Smits as Dr. David Redding
Jack Gwaltney as Kenny Rose
Laura San Giacomo as Lauren Rose
Jane Adams as Suzanne Moloney
Tim Ransom as Bobby Hayes
William Devane as Dr. Chatman
Norma Aleandro as Henrietta Walker
Bradley Whitford as Dr. Donald Ballentine
Lisa Jane Persky as Bobby
Wallace Langham as Gant
James Karen as Dean of Students
Eric Zoltaszek as Student

Development
The film was originally to have been about a country doctor.

Release

Reception
Vital Signs received mixed reviews from critics. Rotten Tomatoes reports that 43% of 7 surveyed critics gave the film a positive review.

Leonard Maltin gave the film one and a half stars and wrote in his review: "Watchable, but of absolutely no distinction; stick with The New Interns, where you can at least compare the acting styles of Dean Jones and Telly Savalas.  Smits effectively projects quiet authority as the surgeon instructor."

Valerie Schoen of the Chicago Tribune also gave the film a star and a half and wrote, "I have to find Vital Signs dead on arrival."

Jay Boyar of the Orlando Sentinel gave the film two stars, calling it "weak - very weak."

Janet Maslin of The New York Times also gave the film an unfavorable review, writing that the film "never has much energy of its own. The film's very basic problem is that it contains no surprising turns, and that its characters are familiar through and through."

Michael Wilmington of the Los Angeles Times wrote, "The movie has everything, which may be its problem. This brisk, whipped-up show has no rough edges."

Jay Carr of The Boston Globe criticized the film's screenplay: "Vital Signs has a much better title than last year's med school outing, Gross Anatomy. But it's not a much better movie. In fact, this coming-of-age-in-med-school film is DOA, sunk by a banal script, the kind that insists that every crisis contain the seeds of its convenient resolution."

Owen Gleiberman of Entertainment Weekly gave the film a positive review: "The movie never strays far from camp, but on its own shameless terms, it delivers."

Home media
20th Century Fox Home Entertainment released the film on DVD on June 7, 2005.  The film was released on Blu-ray on October 1, 2013 by Anchor Bay Entertainment.

References

External links
 
 
 

1990 films
1990s romantic comedy-drama films
20th Century Fox films
American romantic comedy-drama films
1990s English-language films
Films directed by Marisa Silver
Films set in hospitals
Films with screenplays by Jeb Stuart
1990 comedy-drama films
Films scored by Miles Goodman
1990s American films